"For What It's Worth" is the first official single from Placebo's sixth studio album, Battle for the Sun.

Release
It was released on 20 April 2009, in a similar fashion to "Battle for the Sun"; it first played on Zane Lowe's BBC Radio 1 programme, and then was made available as a digital download from iTunes and emusic. The single featured a cover of Nik Kershaw's "Wouldn't It Be Good" as the B-side.

The video for the song was released on the following day, on the band's MySpace page. The single was released in the U.S. via iTunes and UK via emusic on 5 May 2009.

Reception
The single debuted in the UK Singles Chart at No. 97 after it was released exclusively via iTunes. It was nominated for the Kerrang! Award for Best Single.

Track listing
CD
"For What It's Worth" 
"Wouldn't It Be Good" (Nik Kershaw cover)
"For What It's Worth" (demo version)

7"
<li>"For What It's Worth" 
<li>"Wouldn't It Be Good" (Nik Kershaw cover)

Charts

References

Placebo (band) songs
2009 singles
Songs written by Brian Molko
Songs written by Stefan Olsdal
Song recordings produced by David Bottrill
2009 songs
PIAS Recordings singles
Music videos directed by Howard Greenhalgh
Songs written by Steve Forrest (musician)
Songs written by William Patrick Lloyd